The P.W.S.8 was a 1930 Polish sports plane, constructed by the Podlaska Wytwórnia Samolotów (PWS), that remained a prototype.

Design and development
The plane was designed in 1929 by Jarosław Naleszkiewicz in Podlaska Wytwórnia Samolotów, on factory's initiative, to participate in the Challenge 1930 international touring aircraft contest (with P.W.S.50, P.W.S.51 and P.W.S.52). It was a wooden biplane, partly modelled after de Havilland Gipsy Moth. Its unique feature, taken from earlier PWS military aircraft, like P.W.S.5, were N-shaped struts between lower and upper wing and additional oblique transverse struts, stiffening the design, instead of wire braces (similar bracing to Handley Page Gugnunc).

The plane was first flown in 1929 or 1930 by F. Rutkowski, with Armstrong Siddeley Genet 80 hp radial engine. In spring of 1930 it was modified, with Walter Vega 85 hp radial engine, also a tailfin shape and some other details were changed. It was however too heavy for engines used (65 kg heavier, than designed).

The plane was a counterpart of PZL.5 for a sportsplane and trainer, but was worse, and as a result, remained a prototype. Its major fault was low speed, especially in a view of competition purpose.

Operational history
The prototype, with markings SP-ADA, took part in the Challenge 1930 international contest in July 1930, flown by Piotr Dudziński. He was disqualified for time infringement during a rally over Europe, but completed the rally off the contest.

Later the plane was used for a short time by an Aviation Club of the PWS factory. Possibly it was broken up by 1931, because there is information about its engine being used in the repaired P.W.S.51.

Description
The P.W.S.8 was a wooden construction braced biplane. A fuselage was rectangular in cross-section, with plywood skin, except for an engine section, which was duralumin sheet covered. The wings were rectangular three-section, two-spar, with rounded tips, canvas covered (plywood covered on a leading edge). The ailerons were on a lower wing, which had a smaller span of 9 m. The wings were folding rearwards (width with folded wings was 2.95 m). Crew of two, sitting in tandem in open cockpits with windshields. Cockpits with dual controls (a front cockpit had removable steering stick). The third cab could be set up in a baggage compartment behind.

The plane had 5-cylinder air-cooled radial engine Walter Vega in front, developing 85 hp nominal power and 90 hp take-off power. Two-blade wooden propeller Heine of a fixed pitch. Conventional fixed landing gear, with a rear skid. Fuel tank 125 L in upper central wing section (additional 60 L tank could be mounted in the fuselage front). Fuel consumption - 22 L/hour.

Specifications (P.W.S.8)

See also

References

External links

Photos and drawings at Ugolok Neba

1930s Polish sport aircraft
PWS aircraft
Biplanes
Single-engined tractor aircraft
Aircraft first flown in 1929